Mother Nature's Candy is an EP released by Magic Eight Ball. It is also their first release on their own record label, Magic Cat Records.

Track listing

Personnel

Musicians 
 Baz Francis - All vocals, guitars, bass and keyboards (except where stated otherwise below) 
 Kate Wilkinson - Drums/percussion on tracks 1–4, additional backing vocals on track 3 
 Michael Gates: Percussion on track 5 and live drums on iTunes bonus tracks 8 and 9 
 Andy Copper: Live bass on iTunes bonus tracks 8 and 9 
 Dave Draper - Triggers and drum samples on tracks 1-4

Production 
 Dave Draper - Mixing & Mastering, Production & Engineering on tracks 2-5
 Baz Francis - Production on tracks 1–5, engineering on tracks 2 & 4, Engineering & additional mixing on tracks 1, 2, 4 & 5
 Kate Wilkinson - Production, Engineering & Additional mixing on tracks 1-4
 Michael Gates - Production on track 5

Art Direction 
 Giles Edwards - Artwork design & Concept
 Julia Petrova - Inside modelling, photographs
 Maryhèléna Francis - Illustrations
 Baz Francis - Artwork concept, photographs
 Patricia Board - Photographs
 Charlie Brown - Photographs

Additional Credits 
 Custard Francis - Opening sound on track 5 
 Rhubarb Francis - Closing sound on track 5

References

External links

2011 EPs
Power pop EPs
Magic Eight Ball albums